Janusz Jasiński (born September 4, 1928 in Wołomin) is a Polish historian. He finished an undergraduate degree in history at the Catholic University of Lublin in 1954. He obtained his PhD, under the supervision of Stefan Kieniewicz in 1964 from the University of Warsaw with the dissertation on agrarian reforms in Warmia at the turn of the 19th century ("Reformy agrarne na Warmii w początkach XIX wieku"). He was habilitated in 1982 at the Nicolaus Copernicus University in Toruń on the basis of his work on national identity and consciousness in 19th century Warmia ("Świadomość narodowa na Warmii w XIX wieku").

Since 1993, he has been a professor extraordinarius at the Historical Institute of the Polish Academy of Sciences, and since 1996 a professor ordinarius. Between 1969 and 1980 Jasiński was an editor of the journal Komunikaty Mazursko-Warmińskie (Mazurian-Warmian Communications). As the editor he took special care to establish the journal's independence from the political influence of the authorities of the People's Republic of Poland.

Jasiński has published more than 600 works, including 9 books and 13 edited monographs. He has been the recipient of numerous awards, including the Knight's and the Officer's Cross of Polonia Restituta, the Secretary's Medal of the Polish Academy of Sciences, the Zygmunt Gloger Award, and others, including an honorary citizenship of the city of Olsztyn. He retired in 1998.

References

20th-century Polish historians
Polish male non-fiction writers
1928 births
Living people
People from Wołomin
Nicolaus Copernicus University in Toruń alumni